Charterhouse may refer to:
 Charterhouse (monastery), of the Carthusian religious order

Charterhouse may also refer to:

Places

 The Charterhouse, Coventry, a former monastery
 Charterhouse School, an English public school in Surrey

London locations
 London Charterhouse, London, England, an historic complex of buildings that originally housed a monastery, now the location of such sites as The Charterhouse Hospital
 Charterhouse Square, London, England

Municipalities
 Charterhouse, Somerset, also Charterhouse-on-Mendip, a hamlet in the Mendip Hills, England
 Charterhouse Roman Town, a town in the Roman province of Britannia, located close to Charterhouse-on-Mendip
 Hinton Charterhouse, a village in Somerset, England

Sites of scientific interest
 Charterhouse to Eashing, in Surrey, England
 Hinton Charterhouse Field, in Somerset, England
 Hinton Charterhouse Pit, in Somerset, England

Financial institutions
 Charterhouse Bank, a UK-based investment bank
 Charterhouse Capital Partners, a UK-based private equity firm
 Charterhouse Group, a US-based private equity firm

Other uses
 Shepshed Dynamo F.C., an Association Football club known from 1975 to 1992 as Shepshed Charterhouse

See also
 Certosa (disambiguation), the Italian name for a Carthusian monastery
 Chartreuse (disambiguation), the French name for a Carthusian monastery
 The Charterhouse of Parma, an 1839 novel by Stendhal
 The Charterhouse Suite, see List of compositions by Ralph Vaughan Williams